Stanberry may refer to:

Places
Stanberry, Missouri
Stanberry, Wisconsin, an unincorporated community

People with the surname
John Stanberry, 15th-century English Roman Catholic bishop

See also
Henry Stanbery, American lawyer and Presidential Cabinet member